Microspermum is a genus of Mexican flowering plants in the tribe Eupatorieae within the family Asteraceae.

 Species
 Microspermum debile Benth. - Guerrero, Oaxaca, Chiapas, Michoacán, Jalisco
 Microspermum flaccidum Paul G.Wilson México State
 Microspermum gonzalezii Rzed. - Jalisco
 Microspermum gracillimum Rzed. - Jalisco
 Microspermum hintonii Rzed. - Guerrero
 Microspermum nummulariifolium Lag. - Guerrero, Jalisco, Oaxaca, México State, Michoacán
 Microspermum tenue Paul G.Wilson - Guerrero
 formerly included
see Iltisia Piqueriopsis 
 Microspermum michoacanum (R.M.King) B.L.Turner, synonym of Piqueriopsis michoacana R.M.King
 Microspermum repens (S.F.Blake) L.O.Williams, synonym of Iltisia repens S.F.Blake

References

Eupatorieae
Endemic flora of Mexico
Asteraceae genera
Taxa named by Mariano Lagasca